Chaetadelpha is a genus of plants in the family Asteraceae containing the single species Chaetadelpha wheeleri, or Wheeler's skeletonweed. This brushy perennial plant is native to the western United States (Nevada, eastern California, southeastern Oregon).

Chaetadelpha wheeleri forms a low bush with plentiful erect stems covered in very narrow, long and pointed leaves. Branchlets emerge from the stems and each bears a cylindrical flower which opens at the end into a star-shaped white or pale purple flower with five ray florets. The center of each head is filled with curly pollen-dusted anthers. This species is found most often in sand and scrub, particularly in desert regions.

References

External links 
 USDA Plants Profile
 Jepson Manual Treatment
 Photo gallery

Flora of the Western United States
Monotypic Asteraceae genera
Cichorieae